Thanatpin Township  is a township in Bago District in the Bago Region of Burma. The principal town is Thanatpin.

References

Townships of the Bago Region
Bago District